Robin Lundstrum is a state legislator in Arkansas. She serves in the Arkansas House of Representatives. She is a Republican. She lives in Springdale, Arkansas and represents the 87th District. She began serving in the Arkansas House in January 2015.

Electoral History

References

People from Springdale, Arkansas
Members of the Arkansas House of Representatives

Year of birth missing (living people)
Living people